Safranal is an organic compound isolated from saffron, the spice consisting of the stigmas of crocus flowers (Crocus sativus).  It is the constituent primarily responsible for the aroma of saffron.

It is believed that safranal is a degradation product of the carotenoid zeaxanthin via the intermediate picrocrocin.

Pharmacology
Safranal is an effective anticonvulsant in animal models, shown to act as an agonist at GABAA receptors. Safranal also exhibits high antioxidant and free radical scavenging activity, along with cytotoxicity towards cancer cells in vitro. One of its anticancer mechanisms of action involves disruption of the normal assembly dynamics of cellular microtubules. It has also been shown to have antidepressant properties in animals and pilot studies in humans.

Natural sources
Natural sources of safranal include:
Microcystis (cyanobacterium)
Aspalathus linearis (Rooibos)
Camellia sinensis (Tea leaf)
Crocus sativus (Saffron)
Ficus carica (Fig leaf)
Lycium chinense (Wolfberry)
Cuminum cyminum (Cumin Seed)
Centaurea sibthorpii 
Centaurea amanicola
Centaurea consanguinea
Erodium cicutarium (common stork's-bill or pinweed)
Calycopteris floribunda (Ukshi)
Sambucus nigra (elderberry)
Citrus limon (lemon)
Achillea distans

References

Aldehydes
Antidepressants
Saffron
Monoterpenes
GABAA receptor positive allosteric modulators
Anticonvulsants